Juan Delgadillo may refer to:

Juan Felipe Delgadillo (born 1993), Mexican footballer
Juan Delgadillo (baseball) (born 1982), Mexican pitcher who played in 2014 Caribbean Series
Juan Delgadillo, restaurant owner, of Delgadillo's Snow Cap Drive-In